Szusza Ferenc Stadion (formerly known as Megyeri úti Stadion or simply Megyeri út) is a football stadium in Újpest and the home of Újpest FC. The stadium was designed by Alfréd Hajós and opened on 17 September 1922.  The stadium was renovated in 2000-01; its capacity is 12,670.

Since 2003 the stadium has been named after Ferenc Szusza (1923–2006), one of the best strikers in Hungarian football history.

History

After one year of construction the stadium was opened on 17 September 1922, with the match Újpest v Ferencváros 2-1. From June 1925 to June 1929 a bicycle track was running around the ground allowing it to be used as a velodrome. Since the track was occupying some parts of the stands, the capacity was reduced to 15,000 people.

A flood in 1945 destroyed the stands but after the renovations in 1946 the Megyeri úti Stadion became the largest stadium in Hungary with a capacity of 45,117 people. The stadium saw its first international game in 1948, Hungary beating Romania 9-0.

The main events of the World Festival of Youth and Students were also held in this stadium in 1949. In the mid-50s an athletic track was installed at the stadium reducing the capacity to 32,000.

Floodlights were installed in April 1968, and the Inter-Cities Fairs Cup final against Newcastle United was also held here in 1969. 
The 1972 and 2007 Hungarian Cup final matches were played in the stadium as well.

Until 2000 the only change made in the stadium was the renovation of the floodlight system in 1988. Between 2000 and 2001 the stadium was completely renovated. It was changed into an all-seater stadium, holding 13,501 people and completely roofed.

In 2003 the Megyeri úti Stadion was named Szusza Ferenc Stadion.

On 16 October 2016 István Őze, director of the club, announced that reconstruction of the stadium would be finished by the end of October 2016. The capacity of the stadium was decreased from 13,501 to 12,670.

Attendance

Records
Record Attendance:
 50,000 Hungary v Austria, October 3, 1948, (International Friendly)
 50,000 Hungary v Austria, May 8, 1949, (International Friendly)
 50,000 Hungary v Sweden, November 20, 1949, (International Friendly)

Record league Attendance:
 40,000 Újpest FC v Ferencvárosi TC, September 18, 1949

Record average Attendance (League):
 1952: 20,571

Average attendances (Hungarian League)
2000-01: 3,194
2001-02: 3,437
2002-03: 2,732
2003-04: 3,508
2004-05: 3,389
2005-06: 4,635
2006-07: 3,045
2007-08: 4,053
2008-09: 5,249
2009-10: 3,848

International matches
Until 2021, 29 international matches have been played at Szusza Ferenc Stadion. The ground was the 'home stadium' for the Hungarian national team between 1948 and 1953, and also numerous international games were played here since the reconstruction of 2001. Hungary was unbeaten in the Szusza Stadion from 1948 to 2006 (58 years), when they lost against Norway 4-1.

Match details
 

 

 

 

 

 

 

 

 

 

 

 

 

 

 

 

 

 

 

 

 

 

 

 

 

 

June 8, 2021

Hungary 0- 0 Republic of Ireland

Szusza Ferenc Stadium

Attendances

Gallery

References

External links
Szusza Ferenc stadion (2001-) at magyarfutball.hu
Megyeri úti stadion (1922-2001) at magyarfutball.hu

Újpest FC
Football venues in Hungary
Sports venues in Budapest